Eupithecia microptilota is a moth in the  family Geometridae. It is found in Peru.

The wingspan is about 15–17 mm. The forewings are pale greyish green with black lines. The hindwings whitish, without markings but with a long fringe.

References

Moths described in 1904
microptilota
Moths of South America